Uzbekistan is divided into 12 regions (viloyatlar, singularviloyat, viloyati in compound, e.g. Toshkent viloyati), 1 autonomous republic (respublika, respublikasi in compound, e.g. Qaraqalpaqstan Avtonom Respublikasi), and 1 independent city (shahar or shahri in compounds, e.g. Toshkent shahri). 

Names are given below in the Uzbek language, although numerous variations of the transliterations of each name exist. The regions in turn are divided into 169 districts (tumanlar, singular tuman).

Enclaves and exclaves
There are four Uzbek exclaves, all of them surrounded by Kyrgyz territory in the Fergana Valley region where Kyrgyzstan, Tajikistan and Uzbekistan meet. Chon-Kara is on the Sokh river, between the Uzbek border and the Sokh exclave.

The Kyrgyz village of  Barak (population 627) lies 15 km north of Osh. In August 1999, the area around Barak was occupied by Uzbekistan, cutting it off from Kyrgyz territory. Uzbek forces dug up and blockaded the road to Ak-Tash while also allegedly seizing large areas of Kyrgyz land that had been loaned in the Soviet era but never returned. They entrenched themselves within much of Kyrgyz border territory and refused to leave. Barak became a de facto enclave only 1.5 km from the shifted main border. (Map) In August 2018 Kyrgyz and Uzbek authorities agreed to a land swap that would eliminate the exclave.  The exchange process may take up to two years.

See also
ISO 3166-2:UZ

References

 
Subdivisions of Uzbekistan
Uzbekistan 1
Uzbekistan 1
Regions, Uzbekistan
Uzbekistan geography-related lists